Delta Funding Corporation (abbreviated to DFC) was a specialty consumer finance company that originated, securitized and sold non-conforming mortgage loans.

History
DFC was incorporated in 1996 as a Delaware corporation. DFC was a sub-prime lender focused on lending to individuals who generally do not satisfy the credit, documentation or other underwriting standards set by more traditional sources of mortgage credit, including those entities that make loans in compliance with the conforming lending guidelines of Fannie Mae and Freddie Mac. In 2006, DFC originated $4.0 billion of loans; in 2005 it originated $3.8 billion. A substantial amount of these loans were obtained through telemarketing.

Bankruptcy 
On December 17, 2007, DFC and its operating subsidiaries Delta Funding Corporation, Renaissance Mortgage Acceptance Corporation and Renaissance REIT Investment Corporation, filed voluntary petitions for relief under Chapter 11 of the U.S. Bankruptcy Code with the United States Bankruptcy Court for the District of Delaware. On December 20, 2007 DFC announced that it would be delisted from NASDAQ by December 28, 2007.

Employee Relations and Criticism 
In 2004 DFC and its retail subsidiary, Fidelity Mortgage, Inc. were sued in the United States District Court for the Western District of Pennsylvania. The lawsuit was filed by former loan officers employed by DFC's subsidiary, Fidelity Mortgage, Inc., who accused the company of misclassifying its loan officers as exempt from the federal Fair Labor Standards Act. The Plaintiffs were represented by Nichols Kaster, PLLP. The case was not resolved when DFC filed for bankruptcy protection.

References

Financial services companies established in 1996
Financial services companies of the United States
Companies based in New York (state)
1996 establishments in New York (state)
1996 establishments in the United States
Companies established in 1996